The Wisconsin State Natural Areas Program is a conservation program created to highlight and protect areas with outstanding natural or archaeological resources in the U.S. state of Wisconsin.  There are currently 687 State Natural Areas (SNAs) encompassing almost .  SNAs protect natural communities, geological formations, and archaeological sites for research purposes and as refuges for biodiversity and endangered or threatened species.

 
Wisconsin's State Natural Areas Program was created in 1951, the first such state-sponsored program in the United States, with guidance from early conservationists such as Aldo Leopold, Norman C. Fassett, Albert Fuller, and John Thomas Curtis.

The program is managed by the Bureau of Natural Heritage Conservation in the Wisconsin Department of Natural Resources and advised by the Natural Areas Preservation Council (NAPC), a council of 11 scientists and conservationists. Many SNAs have been established on lands already owned by the state, such as within Wisconsin state parks. Others are on land managed by other entities like the U.S. Forest Service, National Park Service, county governments, or conservation organizations like The Nature Conservancy. In those cases cooperative agreements or conservation easements are used.

Ecosystem management practices range from a "hands-off" approach to very active processes such as introduced species removal and controlled burning.  SNAs are generally open to low-impact recreation like hiking and birdwatching, but disallow intensive activities like camping and mountain biking, and usually lack even basic amenities like restrooms or maintained trails.  Numerous SNAs are closed to the public to protect the most sensitive flora, fauna, and ecosystems, including rare and endangered species.

List of Wisconsin State Natural Areas

See also
 Minnesota Scientific and Natural Areas, a similar program in Minnesota.

References

External links

 State Natural Areas Program Official Site at Wisconsin Department of Natural Resources